Marco Di Meco (born February 5, 1982, in Chieti) is an Italian flute player, composer, music producer writer and teacher.

Biography
His interest in music began with a traditional musical instrument handed down to him by his paternal grandmother. 
He then decided to study the transverse flute and after a year of private study, he was admitted to the "L. D'Annunzio" Academy of Music in Pescara where he studied the instrument with Sandro Carbone and obtained a diploma. In the same year he began his career as a solo artist playing W.A. Mozart's KV313 concert.

During his military service he played the flute in the band of the Livorno Naval Academy. He then continued his music studies at the Swiss-Italian Music Academy in Lugano with Mario Ancillotti where he obtained a diploma in "Interpretation and Performance". At this time he began to write his first verses. He completed his studies at the Italian Flute Academy in Rome with Angelo Persichilli.

He gained important experience playing in symphonic orchestras with illustrious conductors such as Luis Bacalov, Lu Jia, Giorgio Bernasconi, Bruno Tommaso and others playing in many concert hall in Europe. He has attended several workshops of Afro-American music organized by the Columbia College Chicago and the Berklee College of Music.

In November 2013 he signed with Wide Sound label to record his first album 5 Colori as a solo artist. This album was followed by the album Rosalinda released in 2015 for the same label. He is present in the 10 best Italian jazz flutists rewarded by JAZZIT Awards 2015.

As well as his activity in the field of music he is also very active in the literary sphere as a writer of poetry. He started writing poetry during military service.

In April 2016 has been released new studio album Lucilla for Wide Sound distributed by I.R.D International. The album enters the charts in France.

In February 2018 he published the album "Against capitalism Première Symphonie". In this work a new form of musical writing is explored which he calls a hybrid form. In fact, different and distant musical genres are present within the three tracks, such as dodecaphonic music, R&b and swing. In November 2018 he published the plaquette of poetry "Rime" (GEDI Gruppo Editoriale).

He has recorded pieces for several radio and television broadcasting companies like RAI, RAISAT and RSI.

On September 23, 2019, he released the single "Moon Mary Light".

In March 2020 he published the collection of poems "Mixtape", followed by the collection "Marmalù" in February 2022.

Influences
He has been influenced in music by artists such as Bill Evans, Sun Ra, Cannonball Adderley, Anthony Braxton, Jimmy Smith, Frank Zappa, John Surman.

Discography

 2014 – 5 Colori, Wide Sound
 2015 – Rosalinda, Wide 
 2016 – Lucilla, Wide
 2018 – Against Capitalism: Première Symphonie, TuneCore
 2019 – Moon Mary Light, TuneCore

Publications
 2016 – Armonia Applicata-Gli Accordi, Gruppo Editoriale L'Espresso, Roma
 2017 - Notes for a Symphony, 
 2019 - Delia,

Poetic Works
 2005 – Luci di luna, A&B Bonanno, Rome
 2005 – Il Passo delle Sensazioni, Edizioni Ulivo Balerna
 2006 – Teatro evanescenza, Edizioni Ulivo
 2012 – Le isterie di Jennifer, Edizioni Tracce Pescara
 2014 – Artemisia, la rana pittrice e la farfalla, 
 2014 – Negativi ed altri versi, 
 2017 - Intermezzo, 
 2018 - Rime, 
 2019 - Detriti, 
 2020 - Mixtape, 
 2022 - Marmalù,

Gallery

References

External links

 
 
 
 
 
 
 
 https://web.archive.org/web/20160309055612/http://www.may.life/artist/music/marco-di-meco/index.html, Interview
 https://itunes.apple.com/it/artist/marco-di-meco/id899449958, iTunes.ID

Italian jazz flautists
1982 births
Living people
Italian jazz musicians
20th-century Italian musicians
21st-century Italian musicians
20th-century flautists
21st-century flautists